Hold You Up is a vinyl only EP by The Gaslight Anthem released on 10" red vinyl. It was released on November 23, 2012 for Black Friday Record Store Day (limited to 3000 copies). The EP features two original acoustic performances and one cover song.

Composition
Hold You Up includes a cover of Skinny Love by Bon Iver

Track list

References

The Gaslight Anthem albums
2012 EPs
Record Store Day releases